Raymond Scott (born Harry Warnow; September 10, 1908 – February 8, 1994) was an American composer, band leader, pianist, record producer, and inventor of electronic instruments.

Though Scott never scored cartoon soundtracks, his music is familiar to millions because Carl Stalling adapted it in over 120 Bugs Bunny, Porky Pig, Daffy Duck, and other Warner Bros. Looney Tunes and Merrie Melodies cartoons. His compositions may also be heard in The Ren and Stimpy Show (which uses Scott's recordings in twelve episodes), The Simpsons, Duckman, Animaniacs, The Oblongs, Batfink, and Bluey. The only time he composed to accompany animation was three 20-second commercial jingles for County Fair Bread in 1962.

Early life and career
Scott was born in Brooklyn, New York to Russian Jewish immigrants, Joseph and Sarah Warnow. His older brother, Mark Warnow, was a conductor, violinist, and musical director for the CBS radio program Your Hit Parade and encouraged his musical career.

A 1931 graduate of the Juilliard School of Music, where he studied piano, theory and composition, Scott, under his birth name, began his professional career as a pianist for the CBS Radio house band. His brother, Mark, older by eight years, conducted the orchestra. He adopted the pseudonym "Raymond Scott" to spare his brother charges of nepotism when the orchestra began performing the pianist's idiosyncratic compositions. In 1935, he married Pearl Zimney.

In late 1936, Scott assembled a band from among his CBS colleagues, calling it the Raymond Scott Quintette. It was a six-piece group, but he thought "Quintette" (his spelling) sounded "crisper"; he also told a reporter that he feared "calling it a 'sextet' might get your mind off music." His sidemen were Pete Pumiglio (clarinet); Bunny Berigan (trumpet, replaced by Dave Wade); Louis Shoobe (double bass); Dave Harris (tenor saxophone); and Johnny Williams (drums). They made their first recordings in New York on February 20, 1937, for Master Records, owned by music publisher/impresario Irving Mills (Duke Ellington's manager).

The Quintette represented Scott's attempt to revitalize swing music through tight, busy arrangements that reduced reliance on improvisation. He called this style "descriptive jazz" and gave his works unusual titles like "New Year's Eve in a Haunted House", "Dinner Music for a Pack of Hungry Cannibals" (recorded by the Kronos Quartet in 1993), and "Bumpy Weather Over Newark". Although his songs were popular with the public, jazz critics disdained them as novelty music. Besides being a prominent figure in recording studios and on radio and concert stages, Scott wrote and was interviewed in DownBeat, Metronome, and Billboard.

Scott believed in composing and playing by ear. He composed not on paper but "on his band"—by humming phrases to his sidemen or by demonstrating riffs and rhythms on the keyboard and instructing players to interpret his cues. It was all done by ear with no written scores, a process known as head arrangements. Scott, who was also a savvy sound engineer, recorded the band's rehearsals on discs and used the recordings as references to develop his compositions. He reworked, re-sequenced, and deleted passages, and added themes from other discs to construct finished works. During the developmental process, he let his players improvise, but once complete, he regarded a piece as relatively fixed and permitted little further improvisation. Scott controlled the band's repertoire and style, but he rarely took piano solos, preferring to direct the band from the keyboard and leave solos and leads to his sidemen. He also had a penchant for adapting classical motifs in his compositions.

The Quintette existed from 1937 to 1939 and recorded bestselling discs such as "Twilight in Turkey", "Minuet in Jazz", "War Dance for Wooden Indians", "Reckless Night on Board an Ocean Liner", "Powerhouse", and "The Penguin". One of Scott's popular compositions is "The Toy Trumpet", a cheerful pop confection that is instantly recognizable to many people who cannot name the title or composer. In the 1938 film Rebecca of Sunnybrook Farm, Shirley Temple sings a version of the song. Trumpeter Al Hirt's 1964 rendition with Arthur Fiedler and the Boston Pops performed a version. "In an Eighteenth-Century Drawing Room" is a pop adaptation of the opening theme from Mozart's Piano Sonata in C, K. 545.

In 1939, Scott turned his Quintette into a big band. When he was named music director by CBS radio three years later, he organized the first racially integrated radio band. Over the next two years, he hired saxophonist Ben Webster, trumpeter Charlie Shavers, bassist Billy Taylor, trumpeter Emmett Berry, trombonist Benny Morton, and drummer Cozy Cole. In 1942, Scott relinquished his keyboard duties so he could concentrate on hiring, composing, arranging, and conducting. He returned to the keyboard with some of his bands.

In 1941, he led a 13-piece orchestra to produce what he termed "silent music" in New York, making a great show of performing with very little sound. This was one of the earliest performances of the silent or near-silent music canon.

Middle career
After serving as music director for programs Broadway Bandbox from 1942 to 1944, Scott left the network. He composed and arranged music (with lyrics by Bernie Hanighen) for the 1946 Broadway musical Lute Song starring Mary Martin and Yul Brynner.

In the late 1940s, contemporaneous with guitarist Les Paul's studio work with Mary Ford, Scott began recording pop songs using the layered multi-tracked vocals of his second wife, singer Dorothy Collins. A number of these were commercially released, but the technique failed to earn him the chart success of Les Paul and Mary Ford.

In 1948, Scott formed a six-man "quintet" which served for several months as house band for the CBS radio program Herb Shriner Time. The group made studio recordings, some of which were released on Scott's short-lived Master Records label. This was not the Irving Mills-owned label of the same name; Scott allegedly named his label in tribute to the defunct Mills enterprise.

When his brother Mark Warnow died in 1949, Scott succeeded him as orchestra leader on the CBS Radio show Your Hit Parade . During the following year, the show moved to NBC Television, and Scott continued to lead the orchestra until 1957. Collins was a featured singer on Your Hit Parade. The high-profile position paid well, but Scott considered it strictly a "rent gig" and used his salary to finance his electronic music research out of the limelight.

In 1950 Scott composed his first—and only known—classical work, entitled Suite for Violin and Piano. The five-movement suite was performed at Carnegie Hall on February 7, 1950, by violinist Arnold Eidus and pianist Carlo Bussotti, who recorded the work.)

In 1958, while serving as an A&R director for Everest, Scott produced singer Gloria Lynne's album Miss Gloria Lynne. The sidemen included many of the same session players (e.g., Milt Hinton, Sam Taylor, George Duvivier, Harry "Sweets" Edison, Eddie Costa, Kenny Burrell, Wild Bill Davis) who participated in Scott's 1959 Secret 7 recording project.

Electronics and research
Scott, who attended Brooklyn Technical High School, was an electronic music pioneer and adventurous sound engineer. During the 1930s and 1940s, many of his band's recording sessions found the bandleader in the control room, monitoring and adjusting the acoustics, often by revolutionary means. As Gert-Jan Blom and Jeff Winner wrote, "Scott sought to master all aspects of sound capture and manipulation. His special interest in the technical aspects of recording, combined with the state-of-the-art facilities at his disposal, provided him with enormous hands-on experience as an engineer."

In 1946, he established Manhattan Research, a division of Raymond Scott Enterprises. As well as designing audio devices for personal use, Manhattan Research provided customers with sales and service for a variety of devices, including components such as ring modulators, wave, tone, and envelope shapers, modulators, and filters. Of interest were the "keyboard theremin", "chromatic electronic drum generators", and "circle generators". Scott described Manhattan Research as "More than a think factory—a dream center where the excitement of tomorrow is made available today." Bob Moog, developer of the Moog Synthesizer, met Scott in the 1950s, designed circuits for him in the 1960s, and considered him an important influence.

Relying on several instruments of his invention, such as the Clavivox and Electronium, Scott recorded futuristic electronic compositions for use in television and radio commercials and records of electronic music. A series of three albums designed to lull infants to sleep, his work Soothing Sounds for Baby was released in 1964 with the Gesell Institute of Child Development. The public showed little interest in it. But Manhattan Research provided ear-catching sonic textures for commercials.

Scott developed some of the first devices capable of producing a series of electronic tones automatically in sequence. He credited himself as the inventor of the polyphonic sequencer. His electromechanical devices, some with motors moving photocells past lights, bore little resemblance to the all-electronic sequencers of the late Sixties. He began working on a machine he said could compose by artificial intelligence. The Electronium, as Scott called it, with its array of knobs, buttons, and patch panels is considered the first self-composing synthesizer.

Some of Raymond Scott's projects were less complex but still ambitious. During the 1950s and 1960s, he developed and patented electronic telephone ringers, alarms, chimes, and sirens, vending machines, and ashtrays with accompanying electronic music scores, an electronic musical baby rattle, and an adult toy that produced varying sounds dependeding on how two people touched each another. He believed these devices would "electronically update the many sounds around us – the functional sounds."

While these devices foreshadowed the future of electronic music, they were not commercially successful. As Mark Brend wrote at Reverb.com: 
Hindsight reveals Scott as more ideas-man than business-man. Glossy brochures advertised a dizzying array of his inventions: electronic doorbells, multitrack tape recorders, rhythm machines, sequencers, and instruments such as the Clavivox, a kind of keyboard theremin. But these rarely sold. It’s possible that didn’t bother Scott too much, as through the ‘50s he was still earning well from the first phase of his career and had a new income stream composing electronic jingles—for Sprite, Nescafé, and Baltimore Gas and Electric Company, among others.

Scott and Dorothy Collins divorced in 1964, and in 1967 he married Mitzi Curtis (1918–2012). During the second half of the 1960s, he became isolated and secretive about his inventions; he gave few interviews, made no public presentations, and released no records. In 1966–67, Scott (under the screen credit "Ramond Scott") composed and recorded electronic music soundtracks for experimental films by Muppets creator Jim Henson.

During his big band period, Scott endured tense relationships with musicians he employed. But when his career became immersed in electronic gadgetry, he preferred the company of technicians, such as Bob Moog, Herb Deutsch, Thomas Rhea, and Alan Entenmann. Scott welcomed curious visitors to his lab, among them French electronic music pioneer Jean-Jacques Perrey in March 1960.

Motown years

In 1969, Berry Gordy of Motown visited Scott at his Long Island labs to witness the Electronium in action. Impressed by the possibilities, Gordy hired Scott in 1971 as director of Motown's electronic music and research department in Los Angeles, a position Scott held until 1977. No Motown recordings using Scott's electronic inventions have yet been publicly identified. Guy Costa, Head of Operations and Chief Engineer at Motown from 1969 to 1987, said about Scott's hiring:
He started originally working [on the Electronium] out of Berry's house. They set up a room over the garages, and he worked there putting stuff together so Berry could get involved and see the progress. At one point Scott worked out of a studio. The unit never really got finalized—Ray had a real problem letting go. It was always being developed. That was a problem for Berry. He wanted instant gratification. Eventually his interest started to wane after a period of probably two or three years. Finally Ray took the thing down to his house and kept working on it. Berry kind of lost interest. He was off doing Diana Ross movies.

Scott later said he "spent 11 years and close to a million dollars developing the Electronium." After leaving Motown he was mostly unemployed, though hardly inactive. He continued to modify his inventions, adapting computers and primitive MIDI devices to his systems. He suffered a series of heart attacks, ran low on cash, and became a subject on Where Are They Now?

Largely forgotten by the public by the 1980s, he suffered a stroke in 1987 that left him unable to work or engage in conversation. His recordings were largely out of print, his electronic instruments were cobweb-collecting relics, and his royalty stream had slowed to a trickle.

Secret Seven
In 1959, Scott organized a band of top-tier jazz session musicians and recorded an album entitled The Unexpected, credited to The Secret Seven, and released on the Top Rank label.

The cartoon connection
In 1943, Scott sold his music publishing to Warner Bros., who allowed Carl Stalling, music director for Looney Tunes and Merrie Melodies, to adapt anything in the Warner music catalog.

Stalling began peppering his cartoon scores with Scott quotes, such as in The Great Piggy Bank Robbery. Scott's tunes have been licensed to The Simpsons, The Ren and Stimpy Show, Animaniacs, The Oblongs, Batfink, and Duckman. "Powerhouse" was quoted ten times in the Warner Brothers feature Looney Tunes: Back in Action (2003).

Obscurity and rediscovery
Interest in his work revived in the early 1990s, after Irwin Chusid met Raymond and his wife Mitzi at their home in California and discovered a collection of unreleased recordings of rehearsals and studio sessions. In 1992, the release of Reckless Nights and Turkish Twilights by Columbia, produced by Irwin Chusid with Hal Willner as executive producer, was the first major-label compilation by his 1937–39 six-man quintet. A year earlier, Chusid and Will Friedwald produced an album of quintet broadcasts titled The Man Who Made Cartoons Swing for Stash. The director of The Ren & Stimpy Show, John Kricfalusi, began using quintet recordings. In the late-1990s, The Beau Hunks, a Dutch ensemble that performed music written by Leroy Shield for Laurel and Hardy movies, released two albums of by Scott's sextet: Celebration on the Planet Mars and Manhattan Minuet (both released by Basta Audio-Visuals). Members of The Beau Hunks (reconfigured as a "Saxtet", then a "Soctette") performed and recorded Scott works, sometimes in collaboration with the Metropole Orchestra.

The posthumously released Manhattan Research Inc. (Basta, 2000, co-produced by Gert-Jan Blom and Jeff Winner) showcases Scott's pioneering electronic works from the 1950s and 1960s on two CDs (the package includes a 144-page hardcover book). Microphone Music (Basta, 2002, produced by Irwin Chusid with Blom and Winner as project advisors), explores the original Scott Quintette's work. The 2008 CD release Ectoplasm (Basta) chronicles a second (1948–49) incarnation of the six-man "quintet" format, with Scott's wife Dorothy Collins singing on several tracks. In June 2017, Basta issued a 3-LP/2-CD set entitled Three Willow Park: Electronic Music from Inner Space, featuring 61 unreleased electronic recordings made by Scott between 1961 and 1971 (Basta, 2017, produced by Gert-Jan Blom, Irwin Chusid, and Jeff Winner). AllMusic named the set one of the "Best Compilations of 2017".

Devo founding member Mark Mothersbaugh, through his company Mutato Muzika, purchased Scott's only (non-functioning) Electronium in 1996 with the intention of restoring it.

J Dilla sampled "Lightworks" and "Bendix 1: The Tomorrow People" for the track "Lightworks" and "Sprite: Melonball Bounce" for the track "Workinonit" on his final album Donuts.

Death
On February 8, 1994, Scott died of pneumonia in North Hills, Los Angeles, California.

Films and television
In addition to Warner Brothers cartoons (which were intended for theatrical screening), the following films include recordings or works composed or co-composed by Scott: Nothing Sacred (1937, various adapted standards); Ali Baba Goes to Town (1938, "Twilight in Turkey" and "Arabania"); Happy Landing (1938, "War Dance for Wooden Indians"); Rebecca of Sunnybrook Farm (1938, "The Toy Trumpet"; with special lyrics by Jack Lawrence); Just Around the Corner (1938, "Brass Buttons and Epaulettes" [performed by Scott's Quintette, but not composed by Scott]); Sally, Irene and Mary (1938, "Minuet in Jazz"); Bells of Rosarita (1945, "Singing Down the Road"); Not Wanted (1949, theme and orchestrations); The West Point Story (1950, "The Toy Trumpet"); Storm Warning (1951, "Dinner Music for a Pack of Hungry Cannibals"); The Trouble with Harry (1955, "Flagging the Train to Tuscaloosa"; words by Mack David); Never Love a Stranger (1958, score); The Pusher (1960, score); Clean and Sober (1988, "Singing Down the Road"); Honey, I Shrunk the Kids (1989, "Powerhouse" [uncredited, affirmed in out-of-court settlement]); Search and Destroy (1995, "Moment Whimsical"); Funny Bones (1995, "The Penguin"); Lulu on the Bridge (1998, "Devil Drums"); Looney Tunes: Back in Action (2003, "Powerhouse"); Starsky and Hutch (2005, "Dinner Music for Pack of Hungry Cannibals"); RocknRolla (2008, "Powerhouse"); Best of Enemies (2015, "Portofino"); The Space Between Us (2017, "Song of India"); and Won't You Be My Neighbor (2018, "Waltz of the Diddles").

In April 2021, Scott's "Powerhouse" was used in the CBS TV show Young Sheldon, in the opening scene of the episode "Mitch's Son and the Unconditional Approval of a Government Agency" (season 4, ep. 14).

Theater
Lute Song (1946) – musical – composer and orchestrator; the production included "Mountain High, Valley Low" with lyrics by Bernard Hanighen
 Peep Show (1950) – produced by Mike Todd, composed "Desire" to accompany the "Cat Girl" dance routine
 Powerhouse (2009) – produced by Sinking Ship Productions, written by Josh Luxenberg and directed by Jonathan Levin and first staged during the New York International Fringe Festival, is an impressionistic play based on Scott's life and work, choreographed with his music and recordings. It returned to the stage in 2014 for a three-week run at New York's New Ohio Theater.
 Manhattan Research, which premiered at Lincoln Center Out of Doors in August 2013, is a dance work set to Raymond Scott's music, choreographed by John Heginbotham.

Discography
 Raymond Scott - Raymond Scott (Columbia, 1947)
Raymond Scott and His Orchestra Play (MGM, 1953)
 A Yank in Europe – Ted Heath and his Music play Raymond Scott compositions (1956)
 This Time With Strings (Coral, 1957)
 Rock 'n Roll Symphony (Everest, 1958)
 Manhattan Research, Inc. (Columbia, 1959)
 The Secret 7: The Unexpected (Top Rank, 1960)
 Soothing Sounds for Baby volumes 1–3 (Epic, 1963)
 The Raymond Scott Project: Vol. 1: Powerhouse (Stash, 1991)
 The Music of Raymond Scott: Reckless Nights and Turkish Twilights (Columbia, 1992)
 Manhattan Research, Inc. (Basta Music, 2000)
 Microphone Music (Basta Music, 2002)
 Ectoplasm (Basta Music, 2008)
 Suite for Violin and Piano (Basta Music, 2012)
 Raymond Scott Songbook (Li'l Daisy / Daisyworld, 2013)
 Raymond Scott Rewired (Basta Music, 2014)
 Three Willow Park: Electronic Music from Inner Space (Basta Music, 2017)
 The Jingle Workshop: Midcentury Musical Miniatures 1951-1965 (Modern Harmonic, 2019)

References

Bibliography
 Bloom, Ken. American Song. The Complete Musical Theater Companion. 1877–1995. Vol. 2, 2nd edition, Schirmer Books, 1996
 Chusid, Irwin and Jeff Winner, eds., Raymond Scott: Artifacts from the Archives, a 349-page e-publication of selected Scott electronic music ephemera from the archives of the University of Missouri, Kansas City
 Goldmark, Daniel, and Yuval Taylor, eds. The Cartoon Music Book (Chicago Review Press; 2002), . Includes chapter by Irwin Chusid on how Scott's music has been adapted for cartoons
 
 Kernfeld, Barry Dean, ed. The New Grove Dictionary of Jazz, Macmillan, 1988
 Larkin, Colin. The Encyclopedia of Popular Music, 3rd edition, Macmillan, 1998
 Press, Jaques Cattell, ed. ASCAP Biographical Dictionary of Composers, Authors and Publishers, 4th edition, R. R. Bowker, 1980

External links

 Artifacts from the Archives | Raymond Scott (1908-1994)
 Raymond Scott's Musical and Technical Legacy at Google Arts & Culture (2021)
 The Raymond Scott Collection (audio) at the Marr Sound Archives, University of Missouri, Kansas City, Missouri
 The Raymond Scott Collection (documents) at the LaBudde Special Collections Department, University of Missouri, Kansas City
 Chusid, Irwin. "Raymond Scott: The First 100 Years", BoingBoing.net, September 10, 2008
 Grimes, William. "Raymond Scott, 85, a Composer For Cartoons and the Stage, Dies", The New York Times, February 9, 1994 )
 Miller, Paul D., editor. Sound Unbound: Sampling Digital Music and Culture (MIT Press, May 2008), . Chapter 18: "The World of Sound: A Division of Raymond Scott Enterprises," by Jeff Winner
 Raymond Scott Interview NAMM Oral History Library (1986)
 

1908 births
1994 deaths
American electronic musicians
American film score composers
American male film score composers
American jazz composers
American male jazz composers
Songwriters from New York (state)
Television personalities from New York City
American audio engineers
American jazz bandleaders
Jewish American musicians
Juilliard School alumni
Orchestra leaders
Musicians from Brooklyn
Brunswick Records artists
Columbia Records artists
Coral Records artists
Decca Records artists
Epic Records artists
MGM Records artists
Top Rank Records artists
20th-century American pianists
20th-century American composers
Engineers from New York City
20th-century American engineers
Jazz musicians from New York (state)
American male pianists
20th-century American inventors
20th-century American male musicians
20th-century jazz composers
20th-century American Jews
American male songwriters
Jewish American jazz composers